Pearl is a surname. Notable people with the surname include:

Bruce Pearl (born 1960), American college basketball coach
Daniel Pearl (1963–2002), American journalist who was kidnapped and murdered in Pakistan
Judea Pearl (born 1936), computer scientist and philosopher
Matthew Pearl (born 1975), American novelist
Minnie Pearl (1912–1996), American country comedian
Nancy Pearl (born 1945), American librarian
Perry Diamond Pearl (born  1824), American politician
Raymond Pearl (1879–1940), American biologist

See also
Pearl (given name)
Perle (disambiguation)
Margolis, derived from a Hebrew term meaning pearl